Maverick is the soundtrack to the 1994 American film of the same name. It was released in 1994 by Atlantic Records. The album peaked at number four on the Billboard Top Country Albums chart.

Overview
Three cuts from the album made the Hot Country Songs charts: "Renegades, Rebels and Rogues", performed by Tracy Lawrence, reached number 7; Clint Black's "A Good Run of Bad Luck", which also appeared on his album No Time to Kill, reached number 1; and Carlene Carter's "Something Already Gone" reached number 43.

The final track,  a rendition of "Amazing Grace", is credited to the "Maverick Choir". Performers on the song are John Anderson, Archer/Park (Randy Archer and Johnny Park), Clint Black, Suzy Bogguss, Gary Chapman, Billy Dean, Radney Foster, James Garner, Mel Gibson, Amy Grant, Noel Haggard, Faith Hill, Waylon Jennings, Hal Ketchum, Tracy Lawrence, Kathy Mattea, Reba McEntire, John Michael Montgomery, Michael Omartian, Eddie Rabbitt, Restless Heart, Ricky Van Shelton, Danny Shirley (of Confederate Railroad), Larry Stewart (who at this point was not a member of Restless Heart), Joy Lynn White, and Tammy Wynette, with solos by Black, Dean, Grant, Jennings, Ketchum, Mattea, McEntire, Restless Heart, and Wynette. All royalties from this rendition were donated to the Elizabeth Glaser Pediatric AIDS Foundation. Mark Hartley and Larry Fitzgerald were the album's executive producers.

Track listing

Chart performance

Certifications

Score album

Maverick (Original Motion Picture Score) is the soundtrack album to the film featuring composer Randy Newman's musical score.

Track listing
Opening
Annabelle
Fight
Coop
Money in the Bank
In & Out of Trouble
Magic Cards, Maybe/Lucky Shirt
Headed for the Game
Runaway Stage
Sneakin' Around
Maverick
Joseph & the Russian
Oh Bret
A Noble Aims
Trap
The Hanging
Bret Escapes
Bret's Card/Sore Loser
Coop Sails Away
Annabelle Toodleoo
The Commodore	
Pappy Shuffle	
Bath House
Tartine de Merde

References

1994 soundtrack albums
Atlantic Records soundtracks
Country music soundtracks